Rudar may refer to:

Geography
Rudar may refer to:
 Rudar, Hormozgan
 Rudar, alternate name of Rudbar, Khamir, Hormozgan Province
 Rudar, Kerman

Sports
Rudar means 'miner' in South Slavic languages. As such, it became the name of a number of sports clubs based in mining towns across the former Yugoslavia.
FK Rudar Breza, football club from Breza, Bosnia and Herzegovina
FK Rudar Kakanj, football club from Kakanj, Bosnia and Herzegovina
FK Rudar Kostolac, football club from Kostolac, Serbia
NK Rudar Labin, football club from Labin, Croatia
FK Rudar Pljevlja, football club from Pljevlja, Montenegro
FK Rudar Prijedor, football club from Prijedor, Bosnia and Herzegovina
FK Rudar Probištip, football club from Probištip, North Macedonia
NK Rudar Trbovlje, football club from Trbovlje, Slovenia
FK Rudar Ugljevik, football club from Ugljevik, Bosnia and Herzegovina
NK Rudar Velenje, football club from Velenje, Slovenia